Deviation is a 1971 British-Spanish-Swedish exploitation horror film written and directed by José Ramón Larraz, and starring Karl Lanchbury, Lisbet Lundquist, Malcolm Terris, and Sibyla Grey. Its plot follows a young couple in the English countryside who are taken in by a mysterious taxidermist at his country house after a car accident.

Plot

Cast
 Karl Lanchbury as Julian
 Sibyla Grey as Rebecca 
 Lisbet Lundquist as Olivia
 Malcolm Terris as Paul
 Shelagh Wilcocks as Auntie

Production notes

Filming
The film was shot on location in London, England.

Music
In April 2016, Dagored Records issued a limited vinyl release of the film's original musical score by Stelvio Cipriani, made available for Record Store Day.

Release

Home media
The Canadian home video distributor Marquis issued a VHS edition of the film. The cover art features a still of actress Jo-Ann Robinson taken from the 1983 horror film Scalps.

References

External links
 

1971 films
1971 horror films
British horror films
Spanish horror films
Swedish horror films
Films directed by José Ramón Larraz
Films scored by Stelvio Cipriani
Films set in country houses
Films shot in England
1970s British films